Before Dawn: The Music of Yusef Lateef is an album by multi-instrumentalist Yusef Lateef recorded in 1957 and released on the Verve label. The album was produced from Lateef's third recording session under his leadership.

Reception

Allmusic review by Scott Yanow stated: "This is one of the most obscure of all Yusef Lateef recordings...  the set is more bop-oriented than normal... showing how strong and original Lateef could be even playing conventional straight-ahead material. Some of the other pieces look toward the future and/or the East, and all eight selections have their memorable moments... Recommended."

Track listing 
All compositions by Yusef Lateef except as indicated
 "Passion" - 4:04
 "Love Is Eternal" - 6:30
 "Pike's Peak" - 5:30
 "Open Strings" - 6:15
 "Before Dawn" - 5:27
 "Twenty-Five Minute Blues" - 5:27
 "Chang, Chang, Chang" - 2:57
 "Constellation" (Charlie Parker) - 4:47

Personnel 
Yusef Lateef - tenor saxophone, flute,  (track 4) arghul, percussion
Curtis Fuller - trombone
Hugh Lawson - piano, celesta (track 4)
Ernie Farrow - bass, rebab
Louis Hayes - drums

References 

Yusef Lateef albums
1958 albums
Verve Records albums